KNNW (103.1 FM, "103.1 Now FM") is a Mainstream Top 40 (CHR) radio station licensed to Columbia, Louisiana and serving the Greater Monroe area. It is owned by Stephens Media Group, through licensee SMG-Monroe, LLC. 103.1 NOW FM is home to The Jubal Show heard weekdays from 6am to 10am. KNNW is programmed by T-Lay Collins who also performs the Prime Time Show at 7pm. Mike Downhour is the Market Manager. 

The transmitter tower is located in Patterson Dr., Columbia, Louisiana and studio is located in Monroe, Louisiana

History 

KQLQ was originally a rhythmic, billed as "103.1 The Party", until November 2009, when it changed to Top 40/CHR as "Hot 103.1". On September 16, 2014, KQLQ began stunting with songs with the word "now" in their name (i.e. All Right Now, Who Can It Be Now?, Right Now, etc.), while running liners asking "is it now yet?" and to listen the next day at noon. At that time KQLQ rebranded as 103.1 Now FM. The first song on Now FM was "Maps" by Maroon 5.  On October 29, 2014, KQLQ changed their call letters to KNNW, to go with the "Now FM" branding.

Hot 103.1 

Hot 103.1 as the First Top-40 branding from November, 2009-September 17, 2014

References

External links 

Radio stations in Louisiana
Contemporary hit radio stations in the United States
Mass media in Monroe, Louisiana
Radio stations established in 1981
1981 establishments in Louisiana